Konuralan is a village in the Göynücek District, Amasya Province, Turkey. Its population is 83 (2021).

References

Villages in Göynücek District